Resistiré  is a Chilean reality television series broadcast on Mega , Azteca 7, MTV Latin America and MTV Spain which will force a group of contestants to literally answer the question "How much would you pay to survive?". The series drops twenty four adventures on a house with nothing but the clothes on their backs and $500,000 in cash.

Launched on March 17, 2019, with Diana Bolocco and Facundo Gómez hosting the show.

The season finale was aired on July 25, 2019, where Mario Sepúlveda was named the winner.

Production 
The program premiered on 17 March 2019 on Chilean television network Mega. The program's headquarters is an hour away from Santiago and, as a strategy, the network did not reveal the place in order to maintain the isolation of the members. The premise of the show is based on the MTV series Stranded with a Million Dollars, but with the addition of a large number of characters, children and foreigners, isolated over several months, and with the risk of being eliminated not because they were unable to tolerate extreme conditions as in the original show, but due to the program's traditional physical games.

In  Resistiré , the 24 participants will be abandoned in a shelter  -located in the Andes Mountains- in the middle of nowhere without beds, indoor bathrooms, food nor potable water supply, but with half a million dollars that corresponds to the final prize. With that money, they would buy the items they need to survive but with a higher price and through a decision that needs a majoritary consensus in order to be done.

Contestants

Nominations table

Notes
 This contestant was the Leader of her/him team. 
 This contestant was nominated for elimination before the last trial. 
 This contestant was initially nominated, but was saved from going to duel and secured immunity for the week. 
 : During day 2, they voted in an "Extraordinary Trial" if they wanted to eliminate Ignacia or Isaac to recover the lost money or none and not recover the money. 
 : Cass was eliminated but reenters by decision of Boris in exchange for $20,000. 
 : Ignacia was returned by decision of Eleazar in exchange for $20,000. 
 : Alexander returned to the competition with his sister Charlotte.
 : During week 6, the teams were switched. 
 : During week 8, the teams were switched. 
 :  Aída and Manelyk were voted as the favorites of the public, so both had to eliminate someone from the opposing team.. 
 : Laura lost her immunity, because Ignacia took that right away. 
 : Due to Francisca's evacuation from the game, Week 10's elimination was cancelled.
 :   During day 73, the orange team lost the competition, so they were eliminated from the game, but Federico, Manelyk and Mario were returned by the public.
 : During day 74, they voted in an "Extraordinary Trial" to eliminate one of them. 
 :  During day 75, the last nine contestants voted for the three contestants who wanted them to be the finalists.

Summary statistics 
 Entries in bold text indicates nominees who transformed into dualists

References

External links
 Official MEGA Resistiré Website
 Official Azteca 7 Resistiré Website
 Official MTV Latin America Resistiré Website
 Official MTV Spain Resistiré Website

Chilean reality television series
Television shows filmed in Chile